Clemens Graf von Schönborn-Wiesentheid (3 April 1905 – 30 August 1944) was a German Air Force officer who commanded Air Command Arad and Sturzkampfgeschwader 77 (StG 77—77th Dive Bomber Wing) during the Axis-led invasion of Yugoslavia during World War II. He was killed in a flying accident at Sofia, Bulgaria on 30 August 1944. He was planning to attend a General Staff meeting when his aircraft crashed for unknown reasons.

Career
In 1934, Schönborn-Wiesentheid volunteered for service in the Heer (German Army) in 1934 and transferred to the Luftwaffe a year later. In March 1936, Schönborn-Wiesentheid was appointed Staffelkapitän (squadron leader) of 4. Staffel (4th squadron) of Jagdgeschwader 132 "Richthofen" (JG 132—132nd Fighter Wing), succeeding Major Theo Osterkamp who was transferred. On 28 August 1937, he transferred command of 4. Staffel to Oberleutnant Günther Reinecke. Schönborn-Wiesentheid was then appointed Gruppenkommandeur (group commander) of II. Gruppe of Sturzkampfgeschwader 165 (StG 165—165th Dive Bomber Wing).

On 16 April 1940, Schönborn-Wiesentheid succeeded Hauptmann Ernst Ott as Gruppenkommandeur of III. Gruppe of Sturzkampfgeschwader 2  (StG 2—2nd Dive Bomber Wing). He held this position until 15 June 1940 when he transferred command of the Gruppe to Hauptmann Heinrich Brücker. Schönborn-Wiesentheid was killed in a flying accident when his Fieseler Fi 156 Storch liaison aircraft crashed east of Sofia, Bulgaria on 30 August 1944. He was buried in the German war cemetery section of the Central Sofia Cemetery.

Awards
 Knight's Cross of the Iron Cross on 21 July 1940 as Major and Geschwaderkommodore of Sturzkampfgeschwader 77

References

Citations

Bibliography

 
 
 
 
 
 
 
 

1905 births
1944 deaths
Burials at Central Sofia Cemetery
Military personnel from Munich
Luftwaffe pilots
German World War II pilots
Recipients of the Knight's Cross of the Iron Cross
Victims of aviation accidents or incidents in Bulgaria